Argentines who are notable include:

Artists

Roberto Aizenberg, painter and sculptor
Oscar Alemán, jazz guitarist
Antonio Alice, portrait painter
Marcelo Álvarez, tenor
Martha Argerich, concert pianist
Daniel Barenboim, pianist and conductor
Ricardo Basta, jewelry designer
Adolfo Bellocq, lithographer
Antonio Berni, painter
Norma Bessouet, painter
Miguel Ángel Biazzi, painter and sculptor 
Erminio Blotta, sculptor
Julio Bocca, ballet dancer
Gino Boccasile, advertiser
Fabiana Bravo, soprano
Alberto Breccia, cartoonist
Emilio Caraffa, painter
Ricardo Carpani, muralist
Carybé, Argentine-Brazilian painter
Eleonora Cassano, dancer
Juan Carlos Castagnino, painter
Eduardo Catalano, architect and sculptor
Alejandro Christophersen, painter and architect
Ciruelo, cartoonist
Leonor Cecotto, painter, engraver
Gustavo Cochet, painter
Pío Collivadino, painter
Oscar Conti (Oski), cartoonist
Copi, cartoonist
Milagros Correch (born 1991), painter, muralist
Alicia Creus, visual artist
José Cura, tenor
Pablo Curatella Manes, sculptor
Ernesto de la Cárcova, painter
Jorge de la Vega, painter
Cesáreo Bernaldo de Quirós, painter
Ángel María de Rosa, sculptor
Helmut Ditsch, painter
Jorge Donn, dancer
Julio Ducuron, painter
Elizabeth Eichhorn, sculptor
Fernando Fader, painter
León Ferrari, constructivist sculptor
Leonor Fini, painter
Bernarda Fink, mezzo-soprano
Ingrid Fliter, pianist
Lucio Fontana, sculptor
Roberto Fontanarrosa, satirist and cartoonist
Norma Fontenla, ballerina
Raquel Forner, painter
Sol Gabetta,  cellist
Manuel García Ferré, cartoonist
Nicolás García Uriburu, painter and ecologist
Gabriel Garrido, musician
José Walter Gavito, sculptor 
Guillermo Gianninazzi, sculptor
Reinaldo Giudici, painter
Paloma Herrera, ballet dancer
Isabel Iacona, painter
Martín Irigoyen, composer and musician
Ana Kamien, dancer, choreographer, and actor
María Cristina Kiehr, soprano
Gyula Kosice, sculptor
Sebastian Krys, music producer
Horacio Lavandera, concert pianist
Julio Le Parc, sculptor
Saul Lisazo, actor
Cándido López, painter
Alberto Lysy, concert violinist
Rómulo Macció, painter
Eduardo Mac Entyre, painter
Maitena, cartoonist
Tomás Maldonado, painter
Martín Malharro, painter
Marcel Martí, sculptor
Lucien-Achille Mauzan, advertiser, sculptor
Dominic Miller, guitarist
Marta Minujín, conceptual artist
Florencio Molina Campos, illustrator
Lola Mora, sculptor
Guillermo Mordillo, cartoonist
José Neglia, ballerino
Luis Felipe Noé, painter
Marianela Núñez, dancer
Marie Orensanz, conceptual artist
Ludmila Pagliero, ballet dancer
Raquel Partnoy, painter
Jorge Pepe, plastic artist and painter
Celis Pérez, painter and muralist
Emilio Pettoruti, painter
Anselmo Piccoli, painter
Marcelo Pombo, visual artist
Eolo Pons, painter
Alberto Portugheis, concert pianist
Elisa Pritzker, contemporary artist
Prilidiano Pueyrredón, painter
Antonio Pujía, sculptor
Quino, cartoonist
Benito Quinquela Martín, painter
Luciana Ravizzi, ballerina
Carlos P. Ripamonte, painter
Silvia Roederer, pianist
Guillermo Roux, painter
Hermenegildo Sábat, cartoonist
Alberto Saichann, illustrator
Eduardo Schiaffino, painter
Antonio Seguí, painter
Ronald Shakespear, graphic designer 
María Isabel Siewers, classical guitarist
Ramón Silva, painter
María Simón, sculptor
Ricaro Liniers Siri, cartoonist
Eduardo Sívori, painter
Xul Solar, watercolorist, sculptor, inventor of languages
Benjamín Solari Parravicini, painter and psychic
Raúl Soldi, painter
Lino Enea Spilimbergo, painter
Sebastian Spreng, painter and stage designer
Juan Carlos Stekelman, painter
Ricardo Supisiche, painter
Silvia Torras, painter
Carlos Trillo, cartoonist
Luigi Trinchero, sculptor
Terig Tucci, violinist and composer
Rogelio Yrurtia, sculptor

Business

Jorge Antonio, industrialist
Otto Bemberg, industrialist
Jorge Brito, banker
Carlos Bulgheroni, industrialist
Eduardo Costantini, businessman
Francisco de Narváez, businessman
Torcuato di Tella, industrialist
Eduardo Elsztain, businessman
Alfredo Fortabat, industrialist
Marcos Galperin, internet entrepreneur
Daniel Hadad, businessman
Miguel Kiguel, economic and financial expert
Patrick Lynch, businessman and ancestor of Che Guevara
Francisco Macri, industrialist
Mauricio Macri, businessman and president of Argentina
Eduardo Madero, businessman
Carlos Miguens Bemberg, businessman
Nicolás Mihanovich, businessman
Enrique Mosconi, petroleum industry promoter
Patricio Peralta Ramos, developer
Gregorio Pérez Companc, businessman
Agostino Rocca, industrialist
Paolo Rocca, industrialist
Santiago Soldati, businessman
Enrique Susini, businessman
Ernesto Tornquist, businessman
Martín Varsavsky, businessman
Leandro Viotto, entrepreneur
Jaime Yankelevich, businessman and television pioneer

Composers 

Ernesto Acher
Amancio Jacinto Alcorta
Eduardo Alonso-Crespo
Eduardo Arolas
Luis Bacalov
Agustín Bardi
Esteban Benzecry
José Antonio Bottiroli
Enrique Cadícamo
Jorge Calandrelli
Francisco Canaro
Juan José Castro
Mario Davidovsky
Julio de Caro
Carlos di Sarli
Homero Expósito
Gabino Ezeiza
Eduardo Falú
Juan de Dios Filiberto
Roberto Firpo
Gilardo Gilardi
Alberto Ginastera
Osvaldo Golijov
Carlos Guastavino
Martín Irigoyen
Rubén Juárez
Mauricio Kagel
Emilio Kauderer
Carlos López Buchardo
Enrique Maciel
Homero Manzi
Héctor Marcó
Rodolfo Mederos
Silvina Milstein
Juana Molina
Mariano Mores
Sixto Palavecino
Astor Piazzolla
Ariel Ramírez
Waldo de los Ríos
Gustavo Santaolalla
Vicente Scaramuzza
Lalo Schifrin
Oscar Strasnoy
Alicia Terzian
Alejandro Viñao
Ezequiel Viñao
Alberto Williams

Entertainment

A-K

Miguel Abuelo, musician
Alejandro Agresti, filmmaker
Antonio Agri, violinist
Pablo Alarcón, actor
Charly Alberti, drummer and activist
Jorge Facundo Arana, actor and musician
Tito Alberti, jazz drummer
Alfredo Alcón, actor
Norma Aleandro, actress
Oscar Alemán, guitarist
Pola Alonso, actress
Héctor Alterio, actor
Malena Alterio, actress
Luis César Amadori, film director
Blanquita Amaro, actress
Sandro de América, singer and actor
Mike Amigorena, actor and musician
Elvia Andreoli, actress
Héctor Anglada, actor
Graciela Araujo, actress
Carolina Ardohain, model
Imperio Argentina, actress and flamenco dancer
Helena Arizmendi, opera singer
Ana Arneodo, actress
Brenda Asnicar, actress and singer
Federico Aubele, musician
Fernando Ayala, filmmaker
Pedro Aznar, jazz bass guitarist
Héctor Babenco, filmmaker
Christian Bach, actress
Carlos Balá, children's television host
Monchi Balestra, radio personality and television host
Amelita Baltar, tango singer
Gato Barbieri, saxophonist
Dora Baret, actress
Daniel Barone, filmmaker
Sara Barrié, actress
 Stephanie Beatriz, actress
Berenice Bejo, actress
María Luisa Bemberg, filmmaker
Amelia Bence, actress
Lorena Bernal, model and actress
Lola Berthet, actress
Florencia Bertotti, actress, producer and singer
Héctor Bidonde, actor and politician
Fabián Bielinsky, filmmaker
Mauricio "Moris" Birabent, rock composer and musician
Thelma Biral, actress
Betiana Blum, actress
Camila Bordonaba, actress, singer and musician
Tato Bores, humorist
Graciela Borges, actress
Patricio Borghetti, actor
Aída Bortnik, screenwriter
Zeta Bosio, bassist
Juan Diego Botto, actor
Sofía Bozán, actress
Luis Brandoni, actor and politician
Fabiana Bravo, soprano
Norman Briski, actor and theatre director
Argentina Brunetti, actress and writer
Alicia Bruzzo, actress
Rodrigo, cuarteto singer
Chris de Burgh, singer
Daniel Burman, film director
David Chocarro, actor and model
Facundo Cabral, singer
Israel Adrián Caetano, Uruguayan-Argentine filmmaker
Andrés Calamaro, songwriter and rock keyboard player
Liliana Caldini, actress, model, and television host 
Miguel Caló, bandoneónist
Juan José Campanella, filmmaker
Marciano Cantero, singer
Norma Gladys Cappagli, Miss World 1960
Diego Capusotto, comedian
Moria Casán, dancer and actress
Ana Casares, actress
Alfredo Casero, TV entertainer
Gustavo Cerati, singer and guitarist of Soda Stereo
Segundo Cernadas, actor
María Concepción César, vedette
Julio Chávez, actor
Paula Chaves, model and actress
Chenoa, singer
Agustina Cherri, actress and dancer
Graciana Chironi, actress
Jesica Cirio, dancer and model
Gustavo Collini-Sartor, butoh dancer
Felipe Colombo, actor, songwriter and musician Mexican-Argentine
Pascual Contursi, lyricist
Juan Carlos Copes, tango dancer and choreographer
Irma Córdoba, actress
Ada Cornaro, actress
Ignacio Corsini, singer
Antonella Costa, actress
María Teresa Costantini, actress
Edgardo Cozarinsky, filmmaker
Linda Cristal, actress
Quirino Cristiani, cartoonist and film director
Lito Cruz, actor and theatre director
Antonio Cunill Cabanellas, theatre director
Ben Cura, actor and director of film, television and theatre. 
Patricia Dal, actress
Elsa Daniel, actress
Juan d'Arienzo, tango composer and bandleader
Ricardo Darín, actor
Pamela David, model
Sandro de América, singer
Eva De Dominici, actress and model
Florencia De La V, transsexual actress
Andrea del Boca, actress
Hugo del Carril, tango vocalist
Alberto de Mendoza, actor
Iván de Pineda, model and talk show host
Julieta Díaz, actress
Yamila Diaz-Rahi, model
Raúl di Blasio, pianist
Alejandro Dolina, writer, commentator and critic
Juanjo Domínguez, folk guitarist
Martin Donovan, filmmaker
Alejandro Doria, filmmaker
Dorismar, model, show host
María Clara D'Ubaldo, singer
Ulises Dumont, actor
Nancy Dupláa, actress
Paulette Duval, actress
Pablo Echarri, actor
Roberto Escalada, actor
Lali Espósito, actress and singer
Laura Natalia Esquivel, actress and singer
Ada Falcón, actress
Juan Falú, guitarist
Soledad Fandiño, actress and model
Leonardo Favio, actor, singer and filmmaker
José A. Ferreyra, filmmaker
Golde Flami, actress
Gabriela Flores, actress
Vera Fogwill, actress
Dolores Fonzi, actress
Guillermo Francella, actor and comic
Hugo Fregonese, film director
Mariano Frogioni, clarinettist
Mario Gallo, pioneering filmmaker
Verónica Gamba, model
Carlos Gandolfo, stage actor and director
Myrtha Garbarini (1926–2015), opera singer
Delia Garcés, actress
Charly García, musician
Antonio Gasalla, comedian
León Gieco, singer and musician
Susana Giménez, actress, show host
Araceli González, model and actress
Julie Gonzalo, actress
Roberto Goyeneche, tango vocalist
Roy Granata, jazz musician
Darío Grandinetti, actor
Gustavo Guillén, actor 
Jorge Guinzburg, humorist and journalist
Rodrigo Guirao Díaz, actor and musician
Pablo Helman, visual effects supervisor
Antonia Herrero, actress
Olivia Hussey, actress
Adrián Iaies, jazz pianist
Narciso Ibáñez Menta, actor and filmmaker
Rocío Igarzabal, actress
Imperio Argentina, actress and singer
Carlos Inzillo, jazz clarinetist and producer
Martín Irigoyen, composer, musician
Carlos Jiménez, singer
Kevin Johansen, singer and musician
Juan José Jusid, filmmaker
Guido Kaczka, actor, producer and television show host
David Kavlin, actor, singer, radio and television host
Martín Karadagian, professional wrestler
Sergio Kleiner, actor
León Klimovsky, filmmaker

L-Z

La Argentina, flamenco dancer
La Argentinita, flamenco dancer
Lydia Lamaison, actress
Libertad Lamarque, singer and actress
Fernando Lamas, actor
Justo Lamas, singer
Mercedes Lambre, actress and singer
Romina Lanaro, model
Kurt Land, screenwriter and director
Víctor Laplace, actor
Noemi Lapzeon, ballet dancer, choreographer
María Cristina Laurenz, actress
René Lavand, magician
Raúl Lavié, tango vocalist
Ricardo Lavié, actor
Libertad Leblanc, actress
Inda Ledesma, actress and theatre director
Mirtha Legrand, actress and show host
Silvia Legrand, actress
Ana Lenchantin, cellist
Paz Lenchantin, bassist-violinist
Alejandro Lerner, songwriter and pianist
Saúl Lisazo, actor
Nélida Lobato, vedette
Marga López, actress
Carlos López Puccio, musician
Darío Lopilato, actor
Luisana Lopilato, actress and model
Florencia Lozano, actress
Silvina Luna, model and actress
Federico Luppi, actor
Virginia Luque, actress
Tito Lusiardo, actor
Mía Maestro, actress
Ángel Magaña, actor
Jorge Maggio, actor
Arturo Maly, actor
Mona Maris, actress
Jorge Maronna, musician
Jorge Marrale, actor
José Marrone, children's television host
Niní Marshall, comedian
Lucrecia Martel, theater and film director
Duilio Marzio, actor
Gerardo Masana, musician
Mirta Teresita Massa, Miss International 1967
Valeria Mazza, model and businesswoman
Claribel Medina, actress, Puerto Rican by birth, Argentine citizen
Esteban Mellino, comedian
Cecilia Méndez, model
Tita Merello, singer and actress
Juan Carlos Mesa, humorist and screenwriter
Nito Mestre, singer and rock musician
Eduardo Mignogna, filmmaker
Alberto Migré, writer and director
Amanda Miguel, singer
Sandra Mihanovich, musician
Juan Minujín, actor
Osvaldo Miranda, actor
Marianela Mirra, model and actress
Luis Moglia Barth, filmmaker
Juana Molina, actress and musician
Inés Molina, actress
Nuri Montsé, actress
Mercedes Morán, actress
Marcela Morelo, singer
Cris Morena, actress, writer and producer of television
Zully Moreno, actress
Bertha Moss, actress
Marcos Mundstock, musician
Berta Muñiz, actress
Andres Muschietti, filmmaker
Barbara Muschietti, producer
Leonardo Nam, actor
Norma Nolan, Miss Universe 1962
Barry Norton, actor
Carlos Núñez Cortés, musician
Carlos Olguin-Trelawny, film director, screenwriter
Héctor Olivera, filmmaker
Alberto Olmedo, comedian
Palito Ortega, singer
Mecha Ortiz, actress
Fito Páez, songwriter and rock keyboard player
Pappo (Norberto Napolitano), rock musician
Florencio Parravicini, actor
Malvina Pastorino, actress
Soledad Pastorutti, folk and pop singer
Gastón Pauls, actor
Luciana Pedraza, actress and filmmaker
Carolina Peleritti, actress and model
César Pelli, architect
Diego Peretti, actor
Mario Pergolini, variety show host
Carla Peterson, actress
Melina Petriella, actress
Roberto Pettinato, TV entertainer
Ana María Picchio, actress
Malena Pichot, comedian and actress
Cecilia Pillado, actress, classical pianist, Argentine by birth
Marcelo Piñeyro, filmmaker
Jorge Polaco, filmmaker
Lola Ponce, singer, actress and model
Jorge Porcel, comedian
Naomi Preizler, model and artist
Jorge Preloran, filmmaker and a pioneer in ethnobiographic film making
Luca Prodan, Italian-born rock composer and leader of Argentine band Sumo
Luis Puenzo, filmmaker
Osvaldo Pugliese, tango composer
Eugène Py, pioneering cinematographer
Carla Quevedo, actress and designer
Lorenzo Quinteros, actor
Rodolfo Ranni, actor, Italian-born
Daniel Rabinovich, musician
Sergio Renán, director of film and theatre
Alejandro Rey, actor
Susana Rinaldi, singer
Calu Rivero, actress
Edmundo Rivero, tango singer
Inés Rivero, model
Nélida Roca, vedette
Belén Rodríguez, model and actress
Elena Roger, actress
Benjamín Rojas, actor, singer and musician
Alita Román, actress
Manuel Romero, filmmaker
Cecilia Roth, actress
Ariel Rotter, filmmaker
Ingrid Rubio, actress
Sebastián Rulli, actor
Mario Sábato, filmmaker
Sabrina Sabrok, model and TV entertainer
Horacio Salgán, pianist
Dino Saluzzi, jazz bandoneonist
Miguel Sánchez, comedian, actor, show host
Gustavo Santaolalla, composer and musician, Academy Award winner in 2006 and 2007
Julio Saraceni, filmmaker
Isabel Sarli, actress
Lidia Elsa Satragno, news anchor, talk show hostess and politician
Josefina Scaglione, actress and singer
María Martha Serra Lima, singer
Soledad Silveyra, actress
Fernando Siro, actor and director
Mario Soffici, actor
Alejandro Sokol, bassist and drummer
Miguel Ángel Solá, actor
Fernando Solanas, filmmaker and politician
Juan Soler, actor
Julia Solomonoff, actress
Pepe Soriano, actor
Carlos Sorín, filmmaker
Coti Sorokin, songwriter, musician, composer
Mercedes Sosa, folk singer
Hugo Soto, actor
Chango Spasiuk, folk musician and singer
Luis Alberto Spinetta, rock musician and composer
Bruno Stagnaro, filmmaker
Lita Stantic, filmmaker
Martina Stoessel, actress and singer
René Strickler, actor
Adrián Suar, actor and producer
María Eugenia Suárez, actress
Silvana Suárez, Miss World 1978
Eliséo Subiela, filmmaker
Damián Szifrón, filmmaker
Anya Taylor-Joy, actress
María del Luján Telpuk, model
Juan Carlos Thorry, actor and tango musician
Marcelo Tinelli, TV entertainer
Carlos Thompson, actor
Leopoldo Torre Nilsson, filmmaker
Diego Torres, actor, singer and musician
Leopoldo Torres Ríos, filmmaker
Yésica Toscanini, model
Pablo Trapero, filmmaker
Aníbal Troilo, tango bandoneonist and songwriter
Paulina Trotz, model
Daniela Urzi, model
Héctor Varela, tango musician
Micaela Vázquez, actress
Virginia Vera, singer and guitarist
Natalia Verbeke, actress
Diego Verdaguer, actor
Candela Vetrano, actress
Chunchuna Villafañe, actress
Soledad Villamil, actress
Lito Vitale, musician
Alejandro Wiebe, television host
Axel Witteveen, musician
Atahualpa Yupanqui, folk songwriter and musician
Sofía Zámolo, model
Pablo Ziegler, Grammy award-winning pianist, composer and arranger
Olga Zubarry, actress

Fashion
Alan Faena, fashion designer and developer
Paco Jamandreu, haute couturier, confidant of First Lady Eva Perón

Journalism

Carlos Manuel Acuña, journalist 
Horacio Badaraco, journalist and anarchist
Osvaldo Bayer, journalist and filmmaker
Andrés Bellatti, journalist
José Luis Cabezas, photojournalist
Andrés Cantor (born 1962), Emmy-award-winning soccer sportscaster 
Alicia Dujovne Ortiz, journalist and biographer
Daniel Frescó, radio and television anchor
Andrew Graham-Yooll, news editor and writer
Enrique Gratas, television news reporter
Mariano Grondona, television anchorman
Hugo Guerrero Marthineitz, Peruvian-Argentine radio host and commentator
Leonardo Henrichsen, photojournalist
David Kraiselburd, newspaper publisher
Jorge Lanata, journalist and writer
José Mármol, journalist and writer
Karen Maron, war correspondent
Tomás Eloy Martínez, journalist, writer and newspaper founder
Fray Mocho (José Sixto Álvarez), journalist and writer
Eduardo Montes-Bradley, journalist, writer, filmmaker
Joaquín Morales Solá, journalist, commentator and anchor
Conrado Nalé Roxlo, journalist and writer
Roberto Noble, journalist, politician and publisher
Andrés Oppenheimer, television anchorman
Horacio Pagani, sportswriter and announcer
José María Pasquini Durán, journalist and writer
Roberto Payró, journalist and publisher
Pedro Sevcec, television anchorman
Rossana Cecilia Surballe, lawyer, journalist, and diplomat
Rodolfo Terragno, journalist and politician
Jacobo Timerman, journalist and writer
Bernardo Verbitsky, journalist and writer
Horacio Verbitsky, journalist, activist and writer
Constancio C. Vigil, journalist, writer and publisher
Fabian Waintal, journalist

Public service

Military 

Ignacio Álvarez Thomas, early military leader
Pedro Aramburu, dictator, 1955–58
Manuel Belgrano, politician, creator of the Argentine flag in 1812
Guillermo Brown, distinguished admiral
Carlos María de Alvear, early military leader
Hippolyte de Bouchard, privateer and early captain of Argentine Navy
Federico de Brandsen, early military leader
Martín Miguel de Güemes, early military leader
Juan Gregorio de las Heras, early military leader
Juan Martín de Pueyrredón, early military leader
José de San Martín, general, liberator of Argentina, Chile and Perú from Spain
Eustaquio Díaz Vélez, early military leader
Leopoldo Galtieri, dictator, 1981–82
Antonio González de Balcarce, early military leader
Juan Lavalle, early military leader
Juan Carlos Onganía, dictator, 1966–70
María Isabel Pansa (born 1961), first woman Army general
José María Paz, early military leader
Martín Rodríguez, early military leader
José Rondeau, early military leader
Manuel Savio, steel industry promoter
Samuel Spiro, navy captain
Jorge Videla, dictator, 1976–81

Politics 

Josep Borrell Fontelles, Spanish politician serving as High Representative of the Union for Foreign Affairs and Security Policy and former Minister of Foreign Affairs, European Union and Cooperation in the Government of Spain. He acquired Argentine citizenship in 2019.
Pablo Rodriguez, politician
Rafael Grossi, politician
Juan Bautista Alberdi, constitutional scholar
Leandro Alem, founder of the centrist Radical Civic Union
Oscar Alende, reformist governor
Raúl Alfonsín, president, 1983–89
Ricardo Alfonsín, politician
Álvaro Alsogaray, conservative economist
José Arce, diplomat
Ricardo Balbín, prominent leader of the "Unión Cívica Radical" party
José Ber Gelbard, Peronist economic adviser
Hermes Binner, Socialist governor of Santa Fe Province, the first so elected
Ángel Borlenghi, labor leader
Leopoldo Bravo, politician and diplomat
Teodoro Bronzini, former Socialist mayor of Mar del Plata, the first to head a major Argentine city
Dante Caputo, diplomat
Elisa Carrió, politician
Domingo Cavallo, economist
Jorge Cepernic, governor
Julio Cobos, Vice President of Argentina
Marcelo Torcuato de Alvear, president, 1922–28
Hebe de Bonafini, head of the Mothers of the Plaza de Mayo
Alicia Moreau de Justo, wife of Juan B. Justo and prominent socialist leader
Fernando de la Rúa, president, 1999–2001
Francisco de Narváez, politician
Juan Manuel de Rosas, strongman, 1829–52
Justo José de Urquiza, first president of the modern era
Guido di Tella, diplomat
Luis María Drago, diplomat
Eduardo Duhalde, president, 2002–03
Aldo Ferrer, economist
Rogelio Frigerio, economist
Arturo Frondizi, president, 1958–62
Rubén Giustiniani, politician
Ernesto "Che" Guevara, Marxist revolutionary
Daiana Hissa, Minister
Arturo Illía, president, 1963–66
Juan B. Justo, founder of the Argentine Socialist Party
Cristina Kirchner, president, 2007–15
Néstor Kirchner, president, 2003–07
Roberto Lavagna, economist
Estanislao López, early pro-autonomy leader
José López Rega, fascist adviser to Pres. Perón
José Alfredo Martínez de Hoz, conservative economist
Francisco Manrique, politician, creator of current national medical and housing funds
Carlos Menem, president, 1989–99
Lorenzo Miguel, labor leader
Bartolomé Mitre, president, 1862–68
Mariano Moreno, independence-era leader and reformer
Enrique Mosconi, promoter of national oil industry
Hugo Moyano, labor leader
Raimundo Ongaro, labor leader
Alfredo Palacios, socialist leader
Eva Perón, influential first lady
Isabel Perón, first lady and president, 1974–76
Juan Perón, president, 1946–55, 1973–74
Juan Pistarini, public works minister and vicepresident
Raúl Prebisch, economist
Facundo Quiroga, early pro-autonomy leader
Bernardino Rivadavia, president
Julio Roca, president, 1880–86, 1898–1904
Dardo Rocha, reformist governor and founder of La Plata
José Ignacio Rucci, labor leader
Carlos Saavedra Lamas, diplomat
Amadeo Sabattini, reformist governor
Roque Sáenz Peña, president and promulgator of the secret ballot in Argentina
Domingo Sarmiento, writer, educator and president (1868–74)
Daniel Scioli, former speedboater, later vice president and governor
Jorge Enea Spilimbergo, poet, Marxist theorist and politician
Margarita Stolbizer, politician
Saúl Ubaldini, labor leader
Dalmacio Vélez Sársfield, author of civil and commercial codes
Hipólito Yrigoyen, president 1916–22, 1928–30

Religion
 Enrique Angelelli, assassinated Bishop of La Rioja
 Sergio Bergman, rabbi, politician, pharmacist, writer and social activist
 Jose Gabriel del Rosario Brochero, Roman Catholic priest canonized as a Saint on 16 October 2016 
 Mamerto Esquiú, friar and activist
 Pope Francis (Jorge Mario Bergoglio), current head of the Catholic Church
 José Gabriel Funes, Jesuit priest and director of the Vatican Observatory
 Gauchito Gil, 19th-century healer
 Claudio Lepratti, assassinated priest and anti-poverty activist
 Carlos Mugica, assassinated priest and anti-poverty activist
 Ceferino Namuncurá, saintly religious student, beatified in 2007
 Pedro Opeka, priest, missionary and humanitarian
 Luis Palau, prominent Protestant-evangelical preacher
 Mario Pantaleo, priest, healer and humanitarian
 Mario Rodríguez Cobos, spiritual leader, writer and activist
 Abraham Skorka, rabbi and biophysicist

Royalty 
 Princess Catharina-Amalia of the Netherlands, half Argentine
 Princess Alexia of the Netherlands, half Argentine
 Princess Ariane of the Netherlands, half Argentine
 Queen Máxima of the Netherlands (Máxima Zorreguieta), Argentine

Sports

Sciences

Luis Agote, M.D., devised first safe blood transfusion
Juan Bautista Ambrosetti, anthropologist and naturalist
Florentino Ameghino, naturalist
Cosme Argerich, doctor
José Antonio Balseiro, nuclear physicist
Lino Barañao, biochemist and current Minister of Science
Dan Jacobo Beninson, nuclear physicist
Cecilia Berdichevsky, computer scientist
Jorge Bobone, astronomer
José Bonaparte, paleontologist
Eduardo Braun-Menéndez, physiologist
Mario Bunge, physicist
Hermann Burmeister, naturalist
Luis Caffarelli, mathematician
Alberto Calderón, mathematician
Ramón Carrillo, neurosurgeon and first Minister of Health
Carlos Ulrrico Cesco, astronomer
Rodolfo Coria, paleontologist
Miguel Rolando Covian, physiologist
Roberto Dabbene, ornithologist
Salvador Debenedetti, archaeologist
René Favaloro, surgeon, inventor of the coronary bypass surgery
Hilario Fernández Long, structural engineer and educator
Enrique Finochietto, surgeon and inventor of numerous surgical tools
Richard Gans, physicist
Mario Garavaglia, physicist
Ramón Enrique Gaviola, astrophysicist
Ana María Gayoso, marine biologist
Mario Giovinetto, geographer
Juan Hartmann, astronomer
Eduardo Ladislao Holmberg, geologist and zoologist
Bernardo Houssay, Nobel Laureate in Medicine and Physiology
Luis Huergo, engineer
Eva Verbitsky Hunt, anthropologist
Armando Theodoro Hunziker, botanist
Miguel Itzigsohn, astronomer
Jakob Laub, physicist
Luis Federico Leloir, Nobel Laureate in Chemistry
Domingo Liotta, M.D., cardiologist, and inventor of the first purely artificial heart
José María Mainetti, oncologist
Julio Isidro Maiztegui, epidemiologist
Juan Martín Maldacena, physicist
Salvador Mazza, epidemiologist
César Milstein, Nobel Laureate in Medicine and Pharmacology
Francisco Moreno, explorer
Julio Navarro, astrophysicist
Virpi Niemelä, astronomer
Fernando Novas, paleontologist
Guillermo O'Donnell, politic scientist
Miguel Ondetti, pharmaceutical scientist
Yolanda Ortiz (chemist), chemist, environmentalist
Evelia Edith Oyhenart, biological anthropologist
Raúl Pateras Pescara, helicopter pioneer
Livio Dante Porta, mechanical engineer
Marta Graciela Rovira, solar physicist
Jorge Sabato, physicist
Julio José Gustavo Sardagna, neurologist and neurosurgeon
Tito Scaiano, laser chemist
Carlos Segers, astronomer
Manuel Sadosky, computer scientist
Luis Santaló, mathematician
Friedrich Schickendantz, naturalist
Dante Tessieri, physicist 
Carlos Varsavsky, astrophysicist
Miguel Angel Virasoro, physicist
Juan Vucetich, inventor of the modern technique of fingerprinting.
Abraham Willink, entomologist
Roberto Zaldívar, ophthalmologist
Nadia Zyncenko, meteorologist

Writers

César Aira
Juan Argerich
Roberto Arlt
Hilario Ascasubi
Enrique Banchs
Héctor Bianciotti
Adolfo Bioy Casares
Isidoro Blaisten
Jorge Luis Borges
Elsa Bornemann
José Antonio Bottiroli
Silvina Bullrich
Susana Calandrelli
Eugenio Cambaceres
Miguel Cané
Martín Caparrós
Evaristo Carriego
Leonardo Castellani
Abelardo Castillo
Haroldo Conti
Gabino Coria Peñaloza
Julio Cortázar
Roberto Cossa
Agustín Cuzzani
Estanislao del Campo
Emma de Cartosio
Marco Denevi
Antonio di Benedetto
Osvaldo Dragún
Esteban Echeverría
Samuel Eichelbaum
Fogwill
Jorge Fondebrider
Luis Franco
Rodrigo Fresán
Silvio Frondizi
Griselda Gambaro
Juan Gelman
Alberto Gerchunoff
Oliverio Girondo
Angélica Gorodischer
Carlos Gorostiza
Juana Manuela Gorriti
Paul Groussac
Eduardo Gudiño Kieffer
Beatriz Guido
Ricardo Güiraldes
Eduardo Gutiérrez
Tulio Halperín Donghi
José Hernández
Guillermo Enrique Hudson
Enrique Anderson Imbert
José Ingenieros
Isol 
Roberto Juarroz
Joseph Kessel
Igor Sergei Klinki
Alejandro Korn
María Hortensia Lacau
Osvaldo Lamborghini
Alfredo Le Pera
Belén López Peiró
Vicente López y Planes
Leopoldo Lugones
Félix Luna
Benito Lynch
Eduardo Mallea
Leopoldo Marechal
Ezequiel Martínez Estrada
Guillermo Martínez
Tomás Eloy Martínez
Carlos Mastronardi
José Nicolás Matienzo
Leonardo Moledo
Ricardo Molinari
Eduardo Montes-Bradley
Manuel Mujica Láinez
Rafael Obligado
Silvina Ocampo
Victoria Ocampo
Pacho O'Donnell
Héctor Germán Oesterheld
Olga Orozco
Juan L. Ortiz
Calixto Oyuela
Pedro Bonifacio Palacios
Alicia Partnoy
Josefina Passadori
Ivo Pelay
Ricardo Piglia
Felipe Pigna
Alejandra Pizarnik
Antonio Porchia
Juan Carlos Portantiero
Manuel Puig
Andrés Rivera
Arturo Andrés Roig
Ricardo Rojas
Ernesto Sabato
Juan José Saer
Beatriz Sarlo
Domingo Faustino Sarmiento
Osvaldo Soriano
Rafael Squirru
Alfonsina Storni
Mario Trejo
Alberto Vaccarezza
Luisa Valenzuela
Florencio Varela
David Viñas
María Elena Walsh
Rodolfo Walsh
Juan Rodolfo Wilcock

Other 

Amancio Alcorta, diplomat and scholar
Marcella Althaus-Reid, theologian
Mario Roberto Álvarez, architect
Pedro Benoit, urbanist and architect
Mabel Bianco (born 1941), physician and women's rights activist
László Bíró, inventor of the ballpoint pen
Gloria Bonder, psychologist
Eliana Bórmida, architect
Eduardo Bradley, aerostat pilot
Juan Antonio Buschiazzo, architect
Alejandro Bustillo, architect
Susana Chiarotti, lawyer and women's rights activist
Julio Dormal, architect
Rosa Dubovsky, feminist, anarchist
Gato Dumas, chef and restaurateur
Carlos Escudé, political scientist
María Amalia Lacroze de Fortabat, executive
Iván Germán Velázquez, former police officer living in Uruguay
Francisco Gianotti, architect
Julio Godio, historian
Carlos Bernardo González Pecotche, pedagogian and philosopher
Clotilde González de Fernández (1880–1935), educator, writer
Roberto Grau, chess player
Soto Grimshaw, explorer and naturalist
Daniel Grinbank, producer
Ernesto Garzón Valdés, philosopher
Paul Groussac, encyclopedist and librarian
Juan María Gutiérrez, educator
Carlos Heller, credit union leader
Otto Krause, educator
Juan Carlos Lectoure, boxing promoter
Roberto Maidana, interviewer
Anibal Mistorni, luthier
Juan Moreira, righteous outlaw
José Luis Murature, diplomat and newspaper editor
Miguel Najdorf, chess player
Eduardo Newbery, aerostat pilot
Jorge Newbery, aviation pioneer
Ernestina Herrera de Noble, publisher
Alejandro Orfila, diplomat and winemaker
Horacio Pagani, auto designer
Mario Palanti, architect
Oscar Panno, chess player
José C. Paz, publisher
César Pelli, architect
Amanda Peralta (1939–2009), guerrilla fighter, later historian in Sweden's Gothenburg University
Adolfo Perez Esquivel, human rights activist and Nobel prize winner
Rogelio Pfirter, diplomat
Patricio Pouchulu, architect
Maria Verónica Reina, disability rights activist
Carlos Saavedra Lamas, academian, politician, the first Latin American Nobel Peace Prize winner
Francisco Salamone, architect
Raúl Scalabrini Ortiz, political and social theorist
Orlando Sconza, professor
José María Sobral, Antarctic explorer
Gerardo Sofovich, producer
Vicente Solano Lima, publisher and politician
Viktor Sulčič, architect
Clorindo Testa, architect
Carlos Thays, renowned landscape architecture
Margarita Trlin, architect
Azucena Villaflor de Vicenti, murdered activist
Fausto Vitello, skateboarder and publisher
Amancio Williams, architect

See also 
 List of people by nationality
 List of German Argentines
 List of Argentine Americans
 List of Argentine Jews
 List of Argentine women artists
 List of Italian Argentines
 List of Asian Argentines
 List of Hungarian Argentines

References